The 1974  Los Angeles International Airport bombing occurred on August 6, 1974 in the overseas passenger terminal lobby of Pan American World Airways at the Los Angeles International Airport. The attack killed three people and injured 36 others.

The attack was perpetrated by 37-year-old  Yugoslavian immigrant Muharem Kurbegovic, who was arrested two weeks after the bombing. Kurbegovic was eventually found guilty of first-degree murder for committing the bombing and an additional attack. He was sentenced to life in prison.

Attack
The bomb exploded at 8:10 AM inside a locker. There were about 50 people in the airport lobby at the time of the explosion. The terminal was evacuated after the blast. The explosion ripped through  of the lobby.

Three people died as a result of the attack, with two victims dying at the scene and an additional victim dying later at the hospital. Thirty-six people were injured in the attack, including a priest who lost a leg.

Kurbegovic was nicknamed "The Alphabet Bomber" because of his alleged plan to attack places in an order that would make an anagram of Aliens of America. He later disputed this and stated that his objective was to "undermine and erode the foundation of Western Civilization, which is the Holy Bible".

In August 1987, Kurbegovic was denied parole.

See also
 Domestic terrorism in the United States

References

1974 disasters in the United States
1974 in Los Angeles
Explosions in 1974
August 1974 crimes
Attacks in the United States in 1974
Aviation accidents and incidents in the United States in 1974
Attacks on airports
1974 murders in the United States
Murder in Los Angeles
Los Angeles International Airport
Terrorist incidents in the United States in 1974
Building bombings in the United States